Bertram Ferryman Beard (1 November 1874 – 2 December 1959) was an English cricketer.  Beard was a right-handed batsman who bowled right-arm medium pace.

Biography
Bertram Beard was born in Rottingdean, Sussex, and was educated at Wellington College.

He made two first-class appearances for Sussex in the 1899 County Championship against Essex and Lancashire, both at the County Ground, Hove.  Against Essex, Beard was dismissed for 4 runs in Sussex's first-innings by Sailor Young, while in their second-innings he wasn't required to bat, with the match ending in a draw.  Against Lancashire, Beard was dismissed for a duck in Sussex's first-innings by Willis Cuttell.  He didn't bat again in the match, as Sussex won by an innings and 2 runs.

He was commissioned as a 2nd Lieutenant in the Royal Garrison Artillery during World War I.  Beard was recorded as living at the upmarket Onslow Gardens in Kensington, London in 1936.  He died at Westminster, London, on 2 December 1959.

References

External links
Bertram Beard at ESPNcricinfo
Bertram Beard at CricketArchive

1874 births
1959 deaths
People from Brighton and Hove
People educated at Wellington College, Berkshire
English cricketers
Sussex cricketers
British Army personnel of World War I
Royal Artillery officers